The MMRV vaccine combines the attenuated virus MMR (measles, mumps, rubella) vaccine with the addition of the chickenpox vaccine or varicella vaccine (V stands for varicella). The MMRV vaccine is typically given to children between one and two years of age.

Several companies supply MMRV vaccines. ProQuad is marketed by Merck and was approved in 2005, for use in the United States by the Food and Drug Administration (FDA) for children ages twelve months through twelve years. An MMRV vaccine called Priorix Tetra by GlaxoSmithKline has been approved in Germany and Australia.

Recommendations

The World Health Organization (WHO) recommends vaccinating against measles, mumps, rubella (German measles), and varicella (chickenpox) because the risks of these diseases far outweigh the risks of vaccinating against them. In particular, the World Health Organization recommends varicella vaccination in countries where the vaccine is affordable, the disease is a relatively important problem, and high and sustained vaccine coverage can be achieved. A few countries have widely implemented this. MMR and varicella vaccine are given at roughly the same time and a booster injection is recommended for both.

The MMRV vaccine, a combined MMR and varicella vaccine, simplifies administration of the vaccines. One 2008 study indicated a rate of febrile seizures of 9 per 10,000 vaccinations with MMRV, as opposed to 4 per 10,000 for separate MMR and varicella shots; U.S. health officials known as the ACIP therefore do not express a preference for use of MMRV vaccine over separate injections.

Contraindications
 For individuals who are moderately or severely ill, it is generally recommended that they wait until after recovery before getting ProQuad. No such precautions are recommended for minor illnesses, such as a cold.
 It is recommended that aspirin or aspirin containing products be avoided for at least six weeks after receiving ProQuad vaccine (aspirin is not recommended in children under 16 in any case). A serious condition called Reye's syndrome has been reported in patients with chicken pox and influenza.
 Individuals should not receive ProQuad without first consulting their doctor if there is a history of a life-threatening allergic reaction to gelatin, eggs, the antibiotic neomycin, or a previous MMR or chicken pox vaccine.

Doctors are advised to be aware of whether or not a patient has HIV/AIDS or another disease that affects the immune system, is taking a medication that affects the immune system, has cancer, a fever or active untreated tuberculosis, is receiving cancer treatment, or has ever had a low platelet count (a blood disorder).

Adverse events

Rare but serious adverse events reported following ProQuad vaccination include allergic reactions, including swelling of the lips, tongue, or face; difficulty breathing or closing of the throat; hives; paleness; weakness; dizziness; a fast heart beat; deafness; long-term seizures, coma, or lowered consciousness; seizures (jerking or staring) caused by fever; or temporary low platelet count.

For children age two and younger, the MMRV vaccine is associated with significantly more adverse events compared to separate administration of MMR and varicella vaccinations on the same day. There are 4.3 additional febrile seizures per 10,000 vaccinated children (95% CI 2.6–5.6), 7.5 additional mostly mild fever episodes per 100 vaccinated children (95% CI, 5.4–9.4) and 1.1 additional measles-like rash per 100 children (95% CI, 0.2–1.8). Febrile seizures caused by the MMRV vaccine occur 7 to 10 days after vaccination. In children age 4–6, there is no evidence for an increased risk in febrile seizures after the administration of Merck Proquad compared to the separate administration of MMR and Varicella vaccines.

Legal status 
Merck ProQuad was approved for medical use in the United States in September 2005, in the European Union in April 2006, and in Australia in February 2007.

GSK Priorix Tetra was approved for medical use in Australia in November 2005.

See also
 Measles vaccine
 MMR vaccine
 Mumps vaccine
 Rubella vaccine
 Varicella vaccine

References

Further reading

External links
 

Chickenpox
Combination drugs
Combination vaccines
GSK plc brands
Live vaccines
Measles
Merck & Co. brands
Mumps
Rubella